Marcel Roger Buyse (born 1892 in Izegem) was a Belgian clergyman and prelate for the Roman Catholic Archdiocese of Lahore. He was appointed bishop in 1947. He retired in 1967, and died in 1974.

References 

1892 births
1974 deaths
Belgian Roman Catholic bishops